Addington FC is a South African football (soccer) club based in Durban.
Addington won both the NFL and the Castle Cup in 1963, and the NFL again in 1969 (as Durban Spurs).

History
Addington FC joined the NFL in 1962, winning the championship in their second season. Before the 1969 season, they were renamed Durban Spurs. Although they won the league that season, it proved to be their last hurrah. By the start of the 1970 season, they had merged with Durban United to form Durban Spurs United.

External links
expro.co.za
1963 Addington Team Photo
1963 Castle Cup Final Players' Profile

See also
 National Football League (South Africa)

 
National Football League (South Africa) clubs
Soccer clubs in Pretoria
Soccer and apartheid